Júlia Sebestyén (born 14 May 1981) is a Hungarian former competitive figure skater. She is the 2004 European Champion and 2002–2010 Hungarian national champion. At the 2004 European Figure Skating Championships, she became the first Hungarian woman to win the European title. She is also a four-time Hungarian Olympic team member, and was Hungary's flag-bearer at the 2010 Olympics.

Personal life
Júlia Sebestyén was born on 14 May 1981 in Miskolc, Hungary. Her full name in Hungarian is Gór-Sebestyén Júlia.

Career
Júlia Sebestyén began skating at the age of three, practicing on the outdoor ice rink in Tiszaújváros. When she was 13, she moved to Budapest where she had better training conditions. Her coach was András Száraz.

Sebestyén began competing on the senior international level in 1995. She made her senior ISU Championship debut at the 1995 European Championships, where she placed 15th. She competed at the 1998 Winter Olympics and placed 15th. In the 1998–1999 post-Olympic season, Sebestyen competed on both the Junior Grand Prix and at senior ISU championships. She made her senior Grand Prix debut in the 1999–2000 season. During summers, she trained in Russia, Slovakia, Sweden, England and the United States due to lack of ice time in Hungary. In 2000, the Budapest ice rink burned down, forcing her to train at an outdoor rink in a city park.

Sebestyén competed at the 2002 Winter Olympics and placed 8th; she was also 8th at that season's Worlds. The next season, she earned her first European Championships medal, a bronze. In 2004, she won the 2004 European Figure Skating Championships, becoming the first Hungarian woman to win that competition. She later finished 6th at the 2004 Worlds, which would prove to be her best result in that event.

Sebestyén competed at the 2006 Winter Olympics, where she placed 18th. She changed coaches to Gurgen Vardanjan shortly after the 2005–2006 season. Her 2006–2007 season got off to a good start; she won the 2006 Cup of China and was the silver medalist at the 2006 Cup of Russia. This qualified Sebestyén for the 2006-2007 Grand Prix Final, where she placed 6th. She was 9th at the 2007 Europeans and 12th at the 2007 Worlds.

Sebestyén suffered a foot injury toward the end of the 2008–09 season, and was unable to compete at 2009 Worlds. As a result, she had to qualify for the Olympics via the 2009 Nebelhorn Trophy, which she was able to accomplish with a fourth-place showing. At the 2009 Skate America, she earned her first Grand Prix medal since 2006, a bronze. Sebestyén, now in her fourth Olympics, was chosen to be Hungary's flag bearer at the opening ceremony. She finished in 17th place at the Olympics, with a total score of 151.26. The final event of Sebestyén's competitive career was the 2010 Worlds, where she placed 15th.

Sebestyén continued to skate in shows and other events, such as the 2010 Japan Open. She is an international technical specialist for Hungary and coaches in Budapest. As of 2014, she is the coach of Ivett Tóth.

Programs

Results

References

External links

Navigation

1981 births
Living people
Sportspeople from Miskolc
Hungarian female single skaters
Olympic figure skaters of Hungary
Figure skaters at the 1998 Winter Olympics
Figure skaters at the 2002 Winter Olympics
Figure skaters at the 2006 Winter Olympics
Figure skaters at the 2010 Winter Olympics
European Figure Skating Championships medalists
Hungarian figure skating coaches
Competitors at the 2001 Winter Universiade